Ernest is a given name derived from Germanic word ernst, meaning "serious". Notable people and fictional characters with the name include:

People

Archduke Ernest of Austria (1553–1595), son of Maximilian II, Holy Roman Emperor
Ernest, Margrave of Austria (1027–1075)
Ernest, Duke of Bavaria (1373–1438)
Ernest, Duke of Opava (c. 1415–1464)
Ernest, Margrave of Baden-Durlach (1482–1553)
Ernest, Landgrave of Hesse-Rheinfels (1623–1693)
Ernest Augustus, Elector of Brunswick-Lüneburg (1629–1698)
Ernest, Count of Stolberg-Ilsenburg (1650–1710)
Ernest Augustus, King of Hanover (1771–1851), son of King George III of Great Britain
Ernest II, Duke of Saxe-Coburg and Gotha (1818–1893), sovereign duke of the Duchy of Saxe-Coburg and Gotha
Ernest Augustus, Crown Prince of Hanover (1845–1923)
Ernest, Landgrave of Hesse-Philippsthal (1846–1925)
Ernest Augustus, Prince of Hanover (1914–1987)
Prince Ernst August of Hanover (born 1954)
Prince Ernst August of Hanover (born 1983)
Saint Ernest (died 1148), German abbot
Ernest Adams (disambiguation)
Ernie Anderson (1923–1997), American radio and television announcer
Ernie Banks (1931–2015), American baseball player
Ernest Benach (born 1959), President of the Catalan parliament
Ernest Bevin (1881–1951), British Labour politician
Ernest Bohr (1924–2018), Danish lawyer, former barrister, and field hockey player
Ernest Broșteanu (1869–1932), Romanian general during World War I
Ernest Buckmaster (1897–1968), Australian artist
Ernest Radcliffe Bond (1919–2003), British police officer and soldier
Ernie Bond (footballer) (born 1929), English footballer
Ernie Bond (politician) (1897–1984), Australian politician
Ernest Borgnine (1917–2012), American actor
Ernie Calloway (born 1948), American football player
Ernie Cooksey (1980–2008), English footballer 
Ernest Corea (1932–2017), Sri Lankan Sinhala journalist, Ambassador of Sri Lanka to the United States from 1981-1986
Ernie Cox (1894–1962), Canadian football player
Ernest Daltroff (1867–1941), French perfumer, and founder of Parfums Caron
Ernie DiGregorio (born 1951), American basketball player
Ernest Duff (1931-2016), American businessman, lawyer and Mormon bishop
Ernie Els (born 1969), South African golfer
Ernest Evans (cricketer) (1861–1948), English cricketer who played for Somerset
Ernest Evans (politician) (1885–1965), Welsh politician
Ernest Everett Just (biologist) (1883-1941), American biologist
Ernest E. Evans (1908–1944), officer of the United States Navy in WWII
Ernest Peter Arnold Fernando (1919–1957), Sri Lankan Sinhala businessman and mine owner
Ernie Fletcher (born 1952), American physician and politician, 60th Governor of Kentucky
Tennessee Ernie Ford (1919–1991), American country singer
Ernest Gold (composer) (1921–1999), American composer
Ernest Gold (meteorologist) (1881–1976), British meteorologist 
Ernest Gjoka (born 1970), Albanian football coach
Ernie Green (born 1938), American football player
Ernesto "Che" Guevara (1928-1967), Argentine physician, author and Marxist revolutionary
Ernie Harwell (1918–2010), American baseball broadcaster
Ernest Haycox (1899–1950), American writer of Westerns
Ernest Hemingway (1899–1961), American writer
Ernest George Horlock (1885–1917), English recipient of the Victoria Cross
E. W. Hornung (1866–1921), English author and poet
Ernie Hughes (born 1955), American football player
Ernie Isley (born 1952), American musician, the Isley Brothers
Ernest Jones (disambiguation), multiple people
Ernest Juvara (1870–1933), Romanian physician
Ernest Koliqi (1903–1975), Albanian writer
Ernie Kovacs (1919–1962), American comedian, actor and writer
Ernest Krausz (1931–2018), Israeli professor of sociology and President at Bar Ilan University
Ernest Lawrence (1901–1958), American nuclear scientist
Ernest Lluch (1937–2000), Catalan-Spanish politician
Ernest Millington (1916–2009), British politician
Ernie Morgan (1927–2013), English football player and manager
Ernie Nordli (1912–1968), American animation artist and graphic designer
Ernest O. Lawrence (1901–1958), American physicist 
Ernest Perera (1932-2013, Inspector-General of Sri Lanka Police from 1988-1993
Ernie Phythian (1942–2020), English footballer
Ernest Victor Pieris (1926-1991), Sri Lankan Sinhala physician, medical educator, cricketer, and rugby union player
Ernest Poruthota (1931–2020), Sri Lankan Sinhala Roman Catholic priest and author
Ernest Prakasa (born 1982), Indonesian comedian, stand up performer, writer, and actor
Ernie Price (1926–2013), English footballer
Ernst Reuter (1889–1953), German politician and mayor of Berlin
Ernest Rutherford (1871–1937), New Zealand chemist and nuclear physicist
Ernest Shackleton (1874–1922), Anglo-Irish explorer
Ernest de Silva (1887–1957), Sri Lankan philanthropist
Ernest (musician) (K. Smith), American country music artist
Ernest Spybuck (1883–1949), American Indian autoethnographer
Ernest Thayer (1863–1940), American poet
 Ernest William Tristram (1882-1952), British art historian, artist and conservator
Ernest Troubridge (1862–1926), British naval officer
Ernest Tubb (1914–1984), American country music singer and songwriter 
Ernest Veuve (1843–1916), American Civil War soldier
Ernest Vinberg (born 1937), Russian mathematician
Ernest Walker (disambiguation)
Ernest Walton (1903–1995), Irish physicist and Nobel laureate
Ernie Watts (born 1945), American saxophonist
Ernie Watts (Small Heath footballer), English footballer
Ernie Watts (footballer, born 1872) (1872–1???), English footballer
Ernie Wise (1925–1999), stage name of English comedian Ernest Wiseman (1925–1999), Morecambe and Wise
Ernie Zalejski (1925–2012), American football player

Fictional characters
Ernest T. Bass, a recurring character on the American TV sitcom The Andy Griffith Show
Ernest Denouement, a character in Lemony Snicket's A Series of Unfortunate Events
Monsieur Ernest LeClerc, on the BBC sitcom 'Allo 'Allo!
Ernest P. Worrell, main comic character of the series of Ernest films as played by Jim Varney
Ernest B. Raykes, in the film Cars
 Ernest, one of the title characters of the Belgian-French franchise Ernest & Célestine
Ernest, in The Swiss Family Robinson
Ernest Worthing, main character in The Importance of Being Earnest, a play by Oscar Wilde
Ernest Perriclof, one of the main characters in Alexandra Adornetto's The Strangest Adventures series
Ernest Greeves, a main character from the video game Layton's Mystery Journey and the associated anime Layton Mystery Tanteisha: Katori no Nazotoki File
Ernest Bonhour, one of the main protagonist in the French animated series The Long Long Holiday

See also 
 Ern (given name)
 Ernst
 Ernesto
 Ernie (disambiguation), shortened version of Ernest
 Earnest (disambiguation)

Masculine given names
English masculine given names
French masculine given names
Slovene masculine given names
Polish masculine given names
Virtue names